Tri-Central Middle/High School is a four-year public high school located in Sharpsville, Indiana, in an unincorporated community approximately 9.2 miles northwest of Tipton, Indiana. The school was created by the merger of Windfall High School and Sharpsville-Prairie High School. Construction on the school started in June 1969 and the school opened on Sept. 8, 1970.  The school is the only high school of the Tri-Central Community School Corporation.

Athletics
The following sports are offered at Tri-Central:

Baseball (boys)
Basketball (boys & girls)
Girls State Champs, 2002–03,2003–04,2005-06 (A)
Cheerleading (girls)
Cross Country (boys & girls)
Football (boys)
State Champs, 2013-2014 (A)
Golf (boys)
Marching Band and Color Guard (boys & girls)
Soccer (boys & girls)
Softball (girls)
Track & Field (boys & girls)
Volleyball (girls)
Wrestling (boys)

See also
 List of high schools in Indiana

References

External links
 Official Website

Schools in Tipton County, Indiana
Public high schools in Indiana
1970 establishments in Indiana